The German Socialist Party (German: Deutschsozialistische Partei, DSP) was a short-lived German nationalist, far-right party during the early years of the Weimar Republic. Founded in 1918, its declared aim was an ideology that would combine both völkisch and socialist elements. However, the party never became a mass movement. After it was dissolved in 1922, many of its members joined the similar National Socialist German Workers' Party (NSDAP) instead.

The DSP was heavily influenced by the antisemitic Thule Society, led by Rudolf von Sebottendorf, as well as publications of engineer Alfred Brunner, who aimed to create a party that would be both nationalist, socialist and attractive to the German proletariat. Similar to the NSDAP, the DSP aimed to win the allegiance of the German proletariat away from Socialism, which had become highly influential following the German Revolution of 1918–1919. 

In 1920, the party (which had originally only existed in Nuremberg and Franconia) attempted to become a nationwide party and compete in the Reichstag elections. However, the party only received about 7,000 votes. 

This led to various attempts to join forces with similar groups: In the summer of 1921, Julius Streicher, an important party official, formed and alliance with the Völkische Werkgemeinschaft. They also tried to bring the NSDAP into the fold but while NSDAP chairman Anton Drexler was open to a merger, the NSDAP's leading speaker, Adolf Hitler, vehemently opposed such a move and threatened to resign from the party. This directly led to Hitler becoming party leader and assuming absolute control over the party. The DSP continued to lose members and popularity and dissolved in late 1922. Streicher and other functionaries joined the NSDAP.

Hitler's opposition might have been influenced by having been rejected by the DSP in 1919. Hans Georg Grassinger, the founding chairman of the DSP, later recalled:

References

External links 
 Siegfried Zelnhefer. Deutschsozialistische Partei (DSP), 1920–1922. Historische Lexikon Bayerns.

1918 establishments in Germany
1922 disestablishments in Germany
Anti-communist parties
Antisemitism in Germany
Far-right political parties in Germany
German nationalist political parties
Political parties established in 1918
Political parties disestablished in 1922
Proto-fascists